Proof is the first anthology album released by South Korean group BTS, on June 10, 2022, through Big Hit Music. The 3-disc project comprises several of the band's singles through the years; a selection of discography "favorites" chosen by the band members; and various demos and previously unreleased tracks. It also includes five new songs: the album's lead single "Yet to Come (The Most Beautiful Moment)", "Run BTS", "For Youth", "Quotation Mark", and "애매한 사이" (Young Love)

The album sold over 2 million copies worldwide on its opening day and topped the charts in 18 territories, including Australia, Germany, Japan, South Korea, the United Kingdom, and the United States. It has been certified gold in France, New Zealand, and Poland; double platinum in Japan; and 3× Million in South Korea.

Background and release 

On December 5, 2021, in conjunction with an announcement that BTS would be devoting more attention to solo projects, Big Hit Music revealed that preparations for the release of an upcoming group album were underway. At the end of the band's final Permission to Dance on Stage concert at Allegiant Stadium on April 16, 2022, a video featuring excerpts of music videos from previous eras in the band's discography was played. The clip ended with the phrase "We are bulletproof" and the date "2022.06.10". The following day, Big Hit confirmed the release of an unnamed album on June 10, with further details to be provided in the near future. The album's title, Proof, was revealed through a video trailer that premiered on YouTube on May 4. The preorder period began later that same day through Weverse Shop.

Per a subsequent notice posted on Weverse and shared via Twitter, the three-disc album comprises tracks spanning the past nine years of the band's discography, as well as three new songs. Two editions of the album, "Standard" and "Compact", were made available for purchase. The schedule for the album's rollout was published on May 5. The track listing for the album's first disc—it comprises 19 tracks—was revealed on May 9 (KST). The disc contains all of BTS' lead singles from "No More Dream" (2013) to "Butter" (2021), as well as the new single "Yet to Come (The Most Beautiful Moment)" which serves as the album's lead track. A remastered version of the band's 2013 song "Born Singer" is also included. Originally released for free by the band shortly after their debut, the song samples "Born Sinner" by American rapper J. Cole from his album of the same name. It has never before been included on any of the band's albums. "Yet to Come" and its accompanying music video were released alongside the album on June 10.

Format 
Two editions of the album—Standard and Compact—were initially made available. Both versions include three CDS, photocards, and postcards. The Standard Edition comes with four booklets and a limited-edition poster while the Compact Edition includes a custom booklet, a mini poster and a "discography guide."

A limited collector's edition of Proof was announced through Weverse on August 28, with preorders opening that same day. Priced at ₩297,000, this version includes a 300-page photobook that features indepth interviews with the band about their discography, a 7-piece premium photo set, and several other collectibles not available with the Standard and Compact versions. Big Hit stated that sales of the album would not count towards any charts. It was released on September 28.

Promotion 
From May 17 to May 23, Proof of Inspiration clips for each member were released. It was followed by the release of two sets of concept photos called "Proof" and "Door" from May 28 to 29 and May 31 to June 2. The images include clear white photographs and dark photographs in front of a steel bank vault, as well as images with icy-blue lighting and variously colored lasers across the band members' faces. BTS made a total of 4 appearances on BigHit Music Record, a program at Melon Station devoted to Big Hit music, on May 20 and 27, June 3 and 10, and July 1 and 8. Apple Music announced on May 26 that BTS would launch a new show, BTS Radio: Past & Present on Apple Music 1. The three-episode limited series aired from May 28 - June 10. The streaming service announced via Twitter on May 31 that the group broke the record for the year's biggest show with the first episode of #BTSRadio on Apple Music 1.  The band's members' statements, unique content, and a countdown to the album release are all featured on Spotify's #SpotifyPurpleU immersive microsite experience. Fans can also use the website to make custom #MyBTSProof share cards based on their favorite songs. From June 3, billboards with the hashtag #SpotifyPurpleU will be visible worldwide, including in South Korea, the US, Brazil, Mexico, Japan, the Philippines, Indonesia, Thailand, and Vietnam.

On June 10, pop-up stores in New York City and Los Angeles were launched, coinciding with their album's release. In addition, goods limited to visitors were sold in each location. BTS also launched the #MyBTStory Challenge on the same day, which is only available on YouTube Shorts. At the end of the month-long challenge, a tribute video honoring a few of the shorts produced by the fans using the album title track will be made available on BTS' official YouTube channel. Each week, BTS will release its own #MyBTStory Shorts featuring a different band member, starting with V on June 17. According to a Weverse announcement from Big Hit Music, the group opened an exhibition titled "2022 BTS EXHIBITION : PROOF" on September 28 in Seoul and on October 5 in Busan based on their creative journey.

Live performances 
BTS performed "Yet to Come (The Most Beautiful Moment)", together with their B-side track "For Youth", on Mnet's M Countdown, KBS2's Music Bank, and SBS' Inkigayo. It is the first time since their 2020 single, "On", that the group performed on South Korean music shows. The group performed "Yet to Come (The Most Beautiful Moment)", "Born Singer," and "For Youth" during "Proof Live" in celebration of the their 9th anniversary on June 13, 2022.  On October 8, 2022, they performed "Yet to Come" and "For Youth" at The Fact Music Awards. For the first time in six months, BTS performed at their "Yet To Come" concert on October 15 at the Busan Asiad Main Stadium in Busan as part of the city's quest to host World Expo 2030. They also debuted the performance of "Run BTS" in which the official stream footage of the performance was posted on their own YouTube channel after the concert.

Music and lyrical content 

Disc one opens with "Born Singer", a hip-hop and R&B track that samples American rapper J. Cole's "Born Sinner". The band reworked the original version to include their lyrics, ad-libs, and production. "Yet To Come (The Most Beautiful Moment)," the album's lead single, follows next.  An alternative hip-hop track co-written by RM, J-Hope, and Suga, longtime producer Pdogg, and American artists Max and Dan Gleyzer, the song's lyrics simultaneously reflect on the band's past while looking towards the future. It contains references to songs such as the band's own "Young Forever" (from 2016's The Most Beautiful Moment in Life: Young Forever) and Kanye West's "Touch The Sky". The production is laid-back, with striking background synths and old-school hip-hop beats from the early 2000s.

Disc two comprises solo and sub-unit tracks, including the new song "Run BTS". A hip-hop/rock track, it features a "thrumming" repetitive guitar riff, and low-key growls of J-Hope, Suga, and RM are heard during the pre-chorus. The song highlights in particular Suga's complex rapping style while showcasing Jimin, V, Jungkook, and Jin's expert vocal abilities, as the singers "deliver some of the most soaring falsettos". Lyrically, the band voice their support for each another and expound on their attitude towards outside influences throughout the three-and-a-half-minute-long track. The band's Korean name, Bangtan Sonyeondan, is referenced in lines where the members talk about the seven of them running "bulletproof."

The third disc is a mixture of 11 demos, two new songs—exclusive to the physical version of the album, and one previously-shelved track. The first of the two new songs is the disc's second track, "Young Love", a collaborative traditional R&B song by RM and Jungkook. The other is track four, "Quotation Mark", by RM, J-Hope, and Jungkook, which has a retro beat similar in vigor to BTS' 2013 song "Like", from the 2 Cool 4 Skool single album. The lyrics feature numerous allusions to past songs by the band. J-Hope's stanza is a replica of his verse from "BTS Cypher: Pt.3-Killer" while other tunes evoke "Love Maze" and "Hold Me Tight." The album's final song, "For Youth," opens with an audio sample from the band's 2019 concert at Wembley Stadium in London, of 90,000 fans singing along to "Young Forever". The song includes a trap beat, rag piano played slowly, and the mellow sounds of a soul band. The lyrics frequently allude to "Spring Day", "Epilogue: Young Forever", "Friends", and various trials the band faced during the previous nine years.

Critical reception

At Metacritic, which assigns a normalized rating out of 100 to reviews from professional publications, Proof received an average score of 88 based on five reviews, indicating "universal acclaim." Natalie Morin of Rolling Stone praised the album, describing its lead single as "a classic BTS blend of sparkling pop and old-school hip-hop that offers a hopeful promise of an even brighter future." Esquire's Ammal Hassan said the album is "more than just a roundup of the best of BTS. Instead, it is a carefully curated story of the group's past and memories, much of which they reflect on in their new songs."

Choi Ji-won of The Korean Herald described the album as something that "offers a throwback to the past, an invitation to the future," and "evidence of BTS' unwavering pursuit of its dreams, which it promises to continue doing in the future." For Times, Elizabeth De Luna cited that Proof shows "an evolution from early raw material to a polished global presentation." In her review for Consequence, Mary Siroky explained how the band "unpack an unparalleled creative journey" through the 48 songs from different eras of their career.

Commercial performance 
On its release day alone, Proof sold over two million copies worldwide. By the end of its first week, it sold a total of 2,752,496 copies. The album debuted at number one in South Korea, Australia, Austria, Belgium, Canada, Finland, Germany, Japan, the Netherlands, New Zealand, Poland, Portugal, and Switzerland. It also reached the top ten in Italy, Lithuania, and Norway. It peaked at number eight in the United Kingdom, becoming the group's fifth top-10 album. The album debuted at number three and peaked at number one on Greece's Albums Chart, giving BTS their first number one in the country.

Proof sold 514,000 copies in Japan during the period dated June 13–19, recording the highest first-week sales on the weekly Oricon Albums Chart in 2022 and achieving the fifth-highest first-week sales of all-time in Oricon chart history, after Mariah Carey's #1's (1998), Boa's Valenti (2003), and BTS' own BTS, the Best (2021) and Map of the Soul: 7 – The Journey (2020). The album is the band's tenth to debut at number one in Japan, extending their record as the foreign artist with the most number-one albums in Oricon chart history.

In the United States, Proof became BTS' sixth consecutive number-one on the Billboard 200. It debuted atop the chart with 314,000 album-equivalent units, including 266,000 pure sales; 36,000 stream-equivalent units (52.84 million on-demand official streams); and 12,000 track-equivalent units. It earned the most significant opening week for a group and the second-largest for an album released in the country in 2022 at the time, both in units accumulated and traditional album sales—Beyoncé's Renaissance eventually claimed the second-largest opening week record with 332,000 overall units in August. Proof also topped Billboards Top Album Sales, Top Current Album Sales, Tastemaker Albums, and World Albums charts. "Yet To Come" debuted at number 13 on the Billboard Hot 100 while "Run BTS" peaked at number 73. BTS received a total of 25 chart placements as a result. The album sold a further 75,000 equivalent units in its second week. Per Luminate Data's year-end report, Proof sold 422,000 physical and digital copies combined in the US, making it the best-selling group album of 2022 and the third best-selling album overall in the country. It was also the second best-selling release on CD format, with 413,000 copies sold.

Accolades 
Proof was nominated for Album of the Year at the 2022 Genie Music Awards, but did not win. Later that month, it was awarded Record of the Year at the Melon Music Awards and Album of the Year at the MAMA Awards. In January 2023, it won a Bonsang and Album of the Year at the 37th Golden Disc Awards, and the Best Album Award at the 32nd Seoul Music Awards. The following month, Proof won Physical Album – 3rd Quarter and Retail Album of the Year at the 12th Circle Chart Music Awards. Additionally, four of its tracks—"Born Singer", "For Youth", "Run BTS", and "Yet to Come"—were nominated in the Global Digital Music – June category, with "Yet to Come" winning. The album was awarded in the Best 3 Albums (Asia) category at the 37th Japan Gold Disc Awards in March.

Track listing 
The digital version of the album only includes "For Youth" from Disc 3.

Notes
 "Born Singer" samples "Born Sinner" by J. Cole from his 2013 album of the same name.

Charts

Weekly charts

Monthly charts

Year-end charts

Certifications

Release history

References 

2022 albums
BTS albums